Pietro Cianci (born 2 February 1996) is an Italian professional footballer who plays as a striker for  club Catanzaro.

Career

Early career
Cianci was born in the Apulia city of Bari, but began his career in the youth teams of Livorno. He moved on to Varese after one year, and played there for a single season before signing for Lega Pro side Fidelis Andria in 2015, on a three-year contract. The tall striker impressed for the Leoni Azzurri, and subsequently made a transfer to Serie A side Sassuolo, signing a 5-year contract.
On 9 July 2019, Cianci signed to Teramo.

Loan moves
Cianci's Sassuolo contract included a one-year loan deal which meant he stayed in Andria for a further year. His first appearance of the 2016–17 season came in a 1–1 draw (AET, lost 3–5 on penalties) with Bassano Virtus in the Coppa Italia. Cianci played the full 120 minutes, but missed the vital penalty in the shoot-out which condemned Andria to defeat. His first goal for Andria since returning on loan came in a 1–1 draw with Akragas in the Lega Pro, scoring the equalising goal in the third minute of stoppage time to rescue a point.

Teramo
On 5 July 2019, he signed a 3-year contract with Teramo.

Loan to Carpi
On 17 January 2020 he was loaned by Carpi.

Loan to Potenza
He was loaned out to Potenza on 25 September 2020. With Potenza, he scored a total 10 goals in 18 appearances, showing off as one of the most effective strikers of the Group C of the 2020–21 Serie C.

Loan to Bari
On 28 January 2021, Cianci was recalled from his Potenza loan and immediately transferred (on loan again) to his hometown's club Bari, second-placed in the Serie C league by the time of the move.

Catanzaro
On 13 August 2021, he signed a 2-year contract with Catanzaro with another 1-year option.

Personal life
Cianci is the cousin of S.S.C. Bari midfielder Nicola Bellomo.

Career statistics

Club

References 

1996 births
Living people
Footballers from Bari
Italian footballers
Association football forwards
Serie C players
S.S. Fidelis Andria 1928 players
U.S. Sassuolo Calcio players
A.C. Reggiana 1919 players
A.C.N. Siena 1904 players
S.S. Teramo Calcio players
A.C. Carpi players
Potenza Calcio players
S.S.C. Bari players
U.S. Catanzaro 1929 players